Craigellachie distillery is a single malt Scotch whisky distillery in the village of Craigellachie at the centre of the Speyside whisky producing area of Scotland. The name Craigellachie means 'rocky hill' and refers to the cliff that overlooks the Spey across from The Macallan distillery.

Bacardi operates the distillery through its subsidiary Dewar & Sons. Dewar & Sons also controls Royal Brackla, Aberfeldy, Aultmore, and Macduff.

History

The Craigellachie distillery was built in 1891 by Craigellachie Distillery Co. Limited, a group of blenders and merchants led by Alexander Edward. Two years later, it was incorporated as a limited company and in 1896 it was reconstructed as Craigellachie-Glenlivet Distillery Ltd.

During the years that followed, ownership passed to Peter Mackie (in 1916), the Distillery Company Limited (in 1927) and SMD (in 1930). The transfer to SMD marked the beginning of a period of stability for Craigellachie; apart from a reconstruction in 1964-65 during which the number of pot stills was doubled, relatively little happened at the distillery. In 1998, it was sold to John Dewar & Sons.

During its history, the distillery has released only a handful of official bottlings. The distillery's product is currently primarily used for Dewar's blended whisky.

In 2014, a 13-year-old, 17-year-old, a travel retail exclusive 19-year-old, and a limited 23-year-old were released as part of the Dewar & Sons' Last Great Malts of Scotland.

External links

Distilleries in Scotland
Scottish malt whisky
1891 establishments in Scotland